is a Japanese actor and voice actor represented by the talent agency Fathers Corporation. He graduated from Rokko Junior and Senior High School and Tokyo University of Marine Science and Technology.

Biography
On 1986, Otani launched the Tokyo Ichi theatre troupe. He served with Kimiko Yo as head of the troupe for years.

After the troupe disbanded, he later launched Gekidan Ichi with Toru Kusano on 2001.

Otani was notable in Aibō as Shinsuke Miura and left the series after the first episode of season 12.

Filmography

TV series

Films

References

External links
Official agency profile 

1954 births
Living people
Japanese male voice actors
Male voice actors from Hyōgo Prefecture